Striatostrombus is an extinct genus of fossil sea snails, marine gastropod mollusks in the family Strombidae, the true conchs.

Species
Striatostrombus currently includes two species:

†Striatostrombus blanci (Tröndlé & B. Salvat, 2010)
†Striatostrombus micklei (Ladd, 1972)

References

External links
 Dekkers A.M. & Maxwell S.J. (2018). Presenting a new genus within Strombidae Rafinesque, 1815 (Mollusca: Gastropoda: Littorinimorpha) with notes on the taxonomic position of Strombus (Lentigo) micklei Ladd, 1972 and the validity of Strombus (s.l.) blanci Tröndlé & Salvat, 2010. Proceedings of the Biological Society of Washington. 131(1) : 220-226.

Stromboidea
Strombidae